Bluebird is the fourth studio album by American musician Dawn Landes. It was released on February 18, 2014 on Western Vinyl.

Critical reception
Bluebird was met with generally favorable reviews from critics. At Metacritic, which assigns a weighted average rating out of 100 to reviews from mainstream publications, this release received an average score of 75, based on 7 reviews.

Track listing

References

2014 albums
Western Vinyl albums